(English trade name Elisa Corporation) is a Finnish telecommunications company founded in 1882. Its previous names were Helsingin Puhelin (until July 2000) and Elisa Communications Oyj (until 2003). Elisa is a telecommunications, ICT and online service company operating mainly in Finland and Estonia, but it also offers digital services for international operators and other companies. In Finland Elisa is the market leader in mobile and fixed network subscriptions. Elisa provides services for communication and entertainment, and tools for improving operating methods and productivity of organisations. It cooperates for example with Vodafone and Tele2.

Elisa offers fixed and mobile subscriptions and broadband subscriptions under Elisa and Elisa Saunalahti brands but also cable-tv-subscriptions. Elisa's digital services offerd in Elisa Polystar and Elisa IndustrIQ brands internationally.  Elisa Kirja is an ebook service. and Elisa Viihde is producing Finnish drama.

Elisa is listed on Nasdaq Helsinki. In 2022, Elisa's revenue was 2.1 billion euros, and the company employed over 5,600 people. In 2021, it was the third largest IT company in Finland in terms of turnover

History

The roots of Elisa (1882–1999) 
On 1882 electrical engineer Daniel Wadén started a telephone company called Helsingin Telefooni (telephone of Helsinki). In 1985 the company became Helsingin Puhelin.

The company launched the first commercial GSM service under the Radiolinja brand in 1991.

In 1995 Radiolinja Eesti AS started operating in Estonia with a GSM network.

In 1997 the company was listed on the Helsinki Stock Exchange as Helsingin Puhelin Oyj.

Elisa Communications Oyj (2000-2003) 
In 2000, the company got a new name: Elisa Communications Oyj.

In 2002 Elisa started to cooperate with Vodafone.

Elisa Oyj (2003–present) 
Since 2003 the company's name has been Elisa Oyj.

In 2005 investment company Novator Partners acquired a 10.4% stake in Elisa through a share swap when Elisa bought the smaller operator Saunalahti, which had been mostly owned by Novator. Novator tried to revamp Elisa in December 2007, but was opposed by Finnish institutions such as Varma Mutual Pension Insurance Company. In October 2008, during the Icelandic financial crisis, Novator sold its entire stake in Elisa to Varma for 194 million euros (US$266 million), a price of €11.20 per share.

In 2005 Radiolinja Eesti AS and fixed and Uninet AS providing fixed networks were merged as Elisa.

Elisa launched the world's first commercial UMTS900 network on 8 November 2007.

In 2011 Elisa opened a webstore selling E-books. Elisa Kirja (Elisa Book) service was offering e-books from the major Finnish publishers.

In 2013, Elisa acquired Sulake, the company behind the teen-oriented online community Habbo. The acquisition followed a child sex scandal where Habbo had lost half of its userbase and Sulake were in financial problems. Elisa sold the majority of Habbo to Azerion in 2018 and the rest in January 2021.

In 2014, Elisa started using unlimited data as the basis for their monthly invoicing. The price was based on the data transfer speed. Soon other operators operating in Finland switched to similar pricing model. As a result, Finland became one of the leaders in the mobile data usage.

In 2015 Elisa founded a startup team to accelerate startup operations.

On 27 June 2018, Elisa launched 5G NR network in the Finnish city of Tampere and in the Estonian capital of Tallinn and was among the first operators in the world with their commercial 5G network. In 2018 Elisa organised "AI Co-creation Challenge" during the Slush event. The winner of EUR 50,000 award was Lifemote.

In June 2019 Elisa bought Swedish Polystar Osix AB, which was providing analytics, assurance and monitoring software solutions for international mobile operators. Elisa had previously founded Elisa Automate, a startup focused on automating network using artificial intelligence. Polystar was merged with it, resulting in Elisa Polystar 

In fall 2020 Elisa and NENT Group known for their Viaplay brand started a common brand called Elisa Viihde Viaplay. While Elisa was in charge of sales, marketing and customer care, NENT Group's part was analytics and technology. The brand was offering the widest selection of Finnish or Nordic original drama content as well as movies, series and program for children from Finland and abroad. In September, Elisa made new deals about 5G networks with both Ericsson and Nokia. It had started the co-operation with Nokia's 5G network in 2019. Elisa told that it was planning to shut down its 3G network by the end of 2023. In March 2020 Elisa acquired a majority of US-based CalcuQuote 

In January 2021 Elisa bought a German-based industrial software provider camLine GmbH. and a share of Italian-based SedApta, and lated during the year majority share of Belgian-based Tenforce 

In April 2022 Elisa acquired Slovak-based FRINX  and in August Cardinality Ltd  At the end of 2022, Elisa's 5G network had population coverage of 86% in Finland and 70% in Estonia 

In February 2023, Elisa received a EUR 3.9 million grant from the Finnish Ministry of Economic Affairs and Employment to utilise the backup power of mobile base stations for electricity supply. The aim is to build 150 MWh of storage capacity

Organisation 
Elisa serves both consumers and corporates. It operates nationwide and has employees also internationally. Elisa's CEO has been from 1 July 2003 Veli-Matti Mattila who is one of the longest serving CEO's of listed companies in Finland.

55 per cent of Elisa's shareholders are Finnish households and institutions. In 2023 the largest shareholders were Finnish national institutions (Solidium Oy, Ilmarinen,  Varma, Elo, City of Helsinki and State Pension Fund. 

HPY Research Foundation funds post-graduate research into telecommunications and by 2016 had made 232 awards worth €989,000.

In February 2023 Elisa's main subsidiaries were 

Cardinality Ltd, UK
camLine GmbH, Germany
Elisa Eesti AS, Estonia
Elisa Santa Monica Oy, Finland
Elisa Videra Oy, Finland
Enia Oy, Finland
Fenix Solutions Oy, Finland
Fonum Oy, Finland
FRINX s.r.o, Slovakia
Kepit Systems Oy, Finland
Polystar OSIX AB, Sweden
TenForce NV, Belgium
Watson Nordic Oy, Finland

Products and services 
Elisa provides services for communication and entertainment, and tools for improving operating methods and productivity of organisations. For internationally operators, Elisa together with its subsidiaries Polystar and camLine GmbH is offering automated network management. The company is also selling automation process based on machine learning to industrial manufacturers. The fixed and mobile subscriptions and broadband subscriptions are sold under Elisa and Elisa Saunalahti brands, but there are also cable-tv-subscriptions. Elisa Kirja concentrates on ebooks.

Elisa Viihde is producing Finnish drama like All the Sins. The series are first available to Elisa Viihde Viaplay customers or on Viaplay after which they are being sold to Finnish or foreign television channels.

E.g. the Finnish Government owned Suomen Erillisverkot  and OP banking group  have outsourced their IT services to Elisa

Recognitions 
 Elisa has been awarded the Great Place to Work in 2017, 2018 and 2019.
 In 2019 it was the first Finnish teleoperator to receive the Finnish Quality Award.
 In 2020, Elisa was ranked the third best telecom operator in the world in a survey by the consulting company Boston Consulting Group. Between 2015 and 2019 it had generated the third highest total return to its shareholders.

References

External links 
 

1882 establishments in Finland
Companies based in Helsinki
Companies established in 1882
Companies listed on Nasdaq Helsinki
Telecommunications companies of Finland
Telecommunications companies of Estonia
Former cooperatives
Internet service providers of Finland
Mobile phone companies of Finland
Mobile phone companies of Estonia
Finnish brands